"Love Has Come" is singer-songwriter Mark Schultz's third single for his fifth studio album Come Alive.

Background
Mark says he used Bible passages to write the song. One passage in particular was Philippians 2:5–11. He also used Isaiah 45:22–24.

Production
Mark said that he wrote two bridges with no verses:

Every knee shall bow, Every tongue confess, That God is love, And love has come for us all.

Glory, glory, hallelujah, Thank You for the cross, Singing glory, glory, hallelujah, Christ has paid the cost.

Producer Brown Bannister helped write the verses and an extra bridge:

Oh, and on that day, We will stand amazed, At our Savior, God and King, Just to see the face, Of amazing grace, As our hearts rise up and sing.

Music video

The music video features Mark singing with a gospel choir. The video was released on March 22.

Critical reception
NRT Contributor Kevin Davis called the single "a great song to sing and praise to."

The music video was recently voted #4 of 10 during the 4th Annual GMC Music Video Awards.

Chart performance
The song debuted at No. 13 on the Billboard Hot Christian Songs chart in its first week of release, and has since peaked at No. 11.

Charts

Personnel
Songwriting – Brown Bannister, Matthew West, Mark Schultz 
Record producer – Brown Bannister
Vocals – Mark Schultz

Release history

References

External links
Music video

2010 songs
Gospel songs
Songs written by Matthew West
Word Records singles
Songs written by Brown Bannister
Song recordings produced by Brown Bannister